The Embassy of Argentina in Beijing is Argentina's main foreign mission in the People's Republic of China. It is located at Sanlitun, Chaoyang District in Beijing, the capital of the PRC. Since , Sabino Vaca Narvaja as has served as Argentinian Ambassador to China.

Besides the PRC, the jurisdiction of the embassy covers also Mongolia.

References

Argentina
Beijing
Argentina–China relations